The Imperial Football Club, nicknamed the Blues, is an Australian rules football club in Murray Bridge, South Australia. It is one of seven clubs that compete in the River Murray Football League (RMFL). Its colours consist of navy and light blues with a white IFC logo.

History 
The Imperial Football Club was formed in 1931 after the Murray Bridge Rovers were split into two separate clubs. The Rambler Football Club shared the same oval for 35 years and were the arch rival of the Blues. In 1966 Imperials moved to Johnstone Park after decided the club needed its own ground and clubrooms.

Imperials have grown to become one of the most successful clubs in its league, winning 22 premierships since their foundation in 1931.

Notable players 
 Martin Mattner (Adelaide Crows, Sydney Swans)
 Chad Wingard (Port Adelaide, Hawthorn)

References

External links 
 

Australian rules football clubs in South Australia
1931 establishments in Australia
Australian rules football clubs established in 1931